Seven Day Weekend is a collection of demos by rock band the New York Dolls. The tracks were recorded at Planet Studios in 1973 but the collection was not released until 1992. In addition to early versions of tracks released on New York Dolls and Too Much Too Soon, there are five tracks that were not released on the studio albums: "Seven Day Weekend", "Back in the USA", "Endless Party", "Great Big Kiss", and "Hoochie Coochie Man". Guitarist Johnny Thunders performed a version of "Great Big Kiss" on his 1978 album So Alone.

Track listing

Personnel
New York Dolls
David Johansen – vocals
Johnny Thunders – lead guitar, vocals
Sylvain Sylvain – rhythm guitar, vocals
Arthur "Killer" Kane – bass guitar
Jerry Nolan – drums

References 

New York Dolls albums
1992 albums